The Louisiana Pirate Festival,  Formally known as Contraband Days, is a 12-day festival filled with Cajun food, family fun, and festivities. Occurring annually in Lake Charles, it is among the larger celebrations in Louisiana, with an attendance of over 200,000. The Festival was first held in 1957.

Held during the first two weeks of May, Contraband Days is the city's official celebration of the legend of the pirate Jean Lafitte. History tells that Lafitte and his band of pirates frequented the area's waterways; they are said to have buried Lafitte's contraband somewhere in the city's vicinity.

The Pirate Festival festivities kick off every year with a pirate ship bombardment to "take control of the city" at the seawall of the Lake Charles Civic Center. A gang of rowdy and unruly buccaneers and "Jean Lafitte" overruns the blazing cannons of the local militia. They then raise their "Jolly Roger" flag and capture the mayor by force with swords drawn and make the mayor walk the plank into the waters of the lake.

No festival was held in 2020.

Thus begins the two-weeks of pageantry and festivities, which include:

Evening parade 
Fireworks shows 
Carnival midway 
Entertainment on three stages 
Sailing regatta 
Cajun cuisine 
Contests 
Beach games 
Thrill attractions 
Many fun-packed competitions, including bed races, bathtub races, and crawfish races 
Nationally-sanctioned speedboat races 
Family night

References

External links 
Official Contraband Days website
 History

Festivals in Louisiana
Lake Charles, Louisiana
Tourist attractions in Calcasieu Parish, Louisiana
Recurring events established in 1957
1957 establishments in Louisiana